The Cox-Klemin XS was a 1920s American experimental scout biplane, the first aircraft to be launched and recovered from a submarine.

Development
Based on a design by the US Bureau of Aeronautics for a simple single-seat scout seaplane that could be disassembled and assembled quickly. Instead of building the aircraft itself the Bureau of Aeronautics contracted the Cox-Klemin Aircraft Corporation to build six aircraft designated XS-1. The aircraft were powered by a 60 hp Lawrance L-4 radial engine. One aircraft was re-engined in 1923 with a Kinner engine and re-designated XS-2.

Operational history
As part of a series of studies conducted by the United States Navy after World War I into the possibility of submarine borne observation and scouting aircraft, the submarine S-1 became the experimental platform for this project late in 1923.  The XS-1, XS-2 and the Martin MS-1 were used for the trials mounted in a cylindrical pod behind the conning tower. After surfacing the aircraft could be rolled out and assembled, it was then launched ballasting the sub until the deck was awash.  The first full cycle of surfacing, assembly, launching, retrieving, disassembly, and submergence took place on 28 July 1926, on the Thames River at New London using the XS-2.

After further trials during 1926 all the experimental aircraft were scrapped.

Variants
XS-1
Lawrance L-4 powered scout biplane, six built
XS-2
One XS-1 modified with a Kinner B-5 engine.
Martin MS-1
Six XS-1 standard aircraft built by Martin.

Operators

 United States Navy

Specifications (XS-2)

See also

References

Bibliography

External links

 Aeroweb

X01S
1920s United States military reconnaissance aircraft
Single-engined tractor aircraft
Biplanes
Floatplanes
Submarine-borne aircraft
Aircraft first flown in 1922